Simonides may refer to:
 Simonides of Ceos, (c. 556–469 BC), a lyric poet
 Simonides the genealogist, author of 3 books called Genealogies and three books called Evrimata (Findings), grandson of Simonides of Ceos the lyric poet
 Semonides of Amorgos, (7th century BC) an iambic poet whose name was generally spelled "Simonides" in ancient texts
 Constantine Simonides (1820–1890), 19th-century forger of 'ancient' manuscripts
 Vasilis Simonides, Greek Nazi collaborator who helped organize the 1942 Eleftherias Square roundup